Lambula is a genus of moths in the family Erebidae. The genus was erected by Francis Walker in 1866.

Species
 Lambula aethalocis Hampson, 1914
 Lambula agraphia Hampson, 1900
 Lambula aroa Bethune-Baker, 1904
 Lambula bilineata Bethune-Baker, 1904
 Lambula bivittata Rothschild, 1912
 Lambula buergersi Gaede, 1925
 Lambula castanea Rothschild, 1912
 Lambula contigua Rothschild, 1916
 Lambula erema Collenette, 1935
 Lambula errata van Eecke, 1927
 Lambula flavobrunnea Rothschild, 1912
 Lambula flavogrisea Rothschild, 1912
 Lambula fuliginosa (Walker, 1862)
 Lambula hypopolius (Rothschild, 1916)
 Lambula laniafera Hampson, 1900
 Lambula melaleuca Walker, 1866
 Lambula malayana Holloway, 1982
 Lambula nigra van Eecke, 1929
 Lambula obliquilinea Hampson, 1900
 Lambula pallida Hampson, 1900
 Lambula phyllodes (Meyrick, 1886)
 Lambula pleuroptycha Turner, 1940
 Lambula plicata Hampson, 1900
 Lambula pristina (Walker, 1866)
 Lambula punctifer Hampson, 1900
 Lambula transcripta (Lucas, 1890)
 Lambula umbrina Rothschild, 1915

Former species
 Lambula dampierensis Rothschild, 1916
 Lambula minuta Rothschild, 1912
 Lambula orbonella Hampson, 1900

References

External links

Lithosiina
Moth genera